Lewis Hugh John Dorey (23 October 1901 – 31 July 1958) was an English first-class cricketer who represented Hampshire in one match in 1925 against Leicestershire. In his only first-class match Dorey was twice dismissed for a duck. 
LHJDorey was a Divisional Officer (Chief Clerk), No.36 (London), Fire Force Headquarters, National Fire Service and the son of printing press owner Henry Vaughan Dorey who was known as 'HVD'.
LHJDorey eventually took over his father (HVD's) as editorship of the weekly magazine Lawn Tennis and Badminton.

Lewis Dorey died 3 years after his father HVD in Belmont, Surrey on 31 July 1958.

Notes

External links
Lewis Dorey at Cricinfo
Lewis Dorey at CricketArchive

1901 births
1958 deaths
Cricketers from St Albans
English cricketers
Hampshire cricketers